Iurie Scala (Yuriy Vasylyovych Skala; born 12 April 1965 in Bilhorod-Dnistrovskyi) is a Moldovan former football player of Ukrainian descent. His twin brother, Alexei Scala, was also a footballer.

In 1992 Iurie Scala played seven matches for Moldova national football team.

References

External links
 
 

1965 births
People from Bilhorod-Dnistrovskyi
Living people
Soviet footballers
CS Tiligul-Tiras Tiraspol players
FC Zimbru Chișinău players
FC Mariupol players
FK Neftchi Farg'ona players
FC Fakel Voronezh players
Kapaz PFK players
Moldovan footballers
FC Nyva Ternopil players
Ukrainian Premier League players
Moldovan expatriate footballers
Expatriate footballers in Romania
FCM Bacău players
FC Lada-Tolyatti players
Expatriate footballers in Russia
Russian Premier League players
FC Zorya Luhansk players
FC Tiraspol players
FC Bukovyna Chernivtsi players
FC Tighina players
Association football midfielders
Association football forwards
Moldova international footballers